Malvina Reynolds (August 23, 1900 – March 17, 1978) was an American folk/blues singer-songwriter and political activist, best known for her songwriting, particularly the songs "Little Boxes", "What Have They Done to the Rain" and "Morningtown Ride".

Early life
Malvina Milder was born in San Francisco, California, United States, to David and Abagail Milder, Jewish and socialist immigrants, who opposed involvement in World War I. Her mother was born in Russia and her father was born in Hungary. She married William ("Bud") Reynolds, a carpenter and labor organizer, in 1934. They had one child, Nancy Reynolds Schimmel (a songwriter and performer), in 1935. Malvina earned her Bachelor of Arts and Master of Arts in English from the University of California, Berkeley, and later earned a doctorate there, finishing her dissertation in 1938.

Music career

Though she played violin in a dance band in her twenties, Reynolds began her songwriting career later in life. She was in her late forties when she met Earl Robinson, Pete Seeger, and other folk singers and songwriters. She returned to school at UC Berkeley, where she studied music theory. Reynolds went on to write several popular songs, including "Little Boxes" (1962), recorded by Seeger, Chilean singer Víctor Jara, and others, "What Have They Done to the Rain" (1962), recorded by The Searchers, The Seekers, Marianne Faithfull, Melanie Safka and Joan Baez (about nuclear fallout), "It Isn't Nice" (1964) (a civil rights anthem), "Turn Around" (1959) (about children growing up, later sung by Harry Belafonte), and "There's a Bottom Below" (about depression). Reynolds was also a noted composer of children's songs, including "Love Is Something (Magic Penny)" and "Morningtown Ride" (1957), a top-5 UK single (December 1966) recorded by The Seekers. Malvina lived on Parker Street in Berkeley.

Four collections of Reynolds' music are available on compact disc. The Smithsonian Folkways label released Another County Heard From (Folkways 02524) and  Ear to the Ground (Smithsonian Folkways 40124), and the Omni Recording Corporation in Australia issued Malvina Reynolds (Omni 112) and Malvina Reynolds Sings the Truth (Omni 114).

Reynolds' most famous song, "Little Boxes" (made famous by Seeger), has enjoyed renewed popularity by being featured in Showtime's TV series Weeds. "Little Boxes" was inspired visually by the houses of Daly City, California. Nancy Reynolds Schimmel, Reynolds' daughter, explained:

My mother and father were driving South from San Francisco through Daly City when my mom got the idea for the song. She asked my dad to take the wheel, and she wrote it on the way to the gathering in La Honda where she was going to sing for the Friends Committee on Legislation. When Time Magazine (I think, maybe Newsweek) wanted a photo of her pointing to the very place, she couldn't find those houses because so many more had been built around them that the hillsides were totally covered.

In her later years, Reynolds contributed songs and material to PBS' Sesame Street, on which she made occasional appearances as a character named Kate.

Activism
In 1977, Reynolds became an associate of the Women's Institute for Freedom of the Press (WIFP). WIFP is an American non-profit publishing organization. The organization works to increase communication between women and connect the public with forms of women-based media.

Other
In 1979, the Supersisters trading card set was produced and distributed; one of the cards featured Reynolds's name and picture.

Reynolds was a Unitarian Universalist.

Death

Shortly after Bud Reynolds' death in September 1972, Reynolds was diagnosed with acute pancreatitis. But she refused to let the disease keep her from her usual performance schedule until the afternoon of March 15, 1978, when she fell ill after a photo shoot in Berkeley. Rushed to the hospital, she died during the early morning hours of March 17, 1978.

Legacy
Reynolds' career was subject to a biographical short film, Love It Like a Fool, released in 1977 and directed by Susan Wengraf.

Reynolds' song "Little Boxes" was used as the theme for the TV show Weeds.

The TV show Big Sky featured the song “Little Boxes” at the end of the episode aptly titled “Little Boxes.”

In 2020, most of the second verse of her one-minute ditty "Place to Be," as recorded by her, was used as the sound for a Zillow commercial.

Two of her songs are included on The Specials’ album Protest Songs 1924–2012 (2021).

References

External links

 Biography at Sister's Choice
 Memories of her mother, by Malvina Reynolds' daughter
 Smithsonian Folkways- Malvina Reynolds
 Malvina Reynolds: Song Lyrics and Poems
 Complete discography
 Orange County Weekly Retrospective
 Orange County Weekly Memoir

1900 births
1978 deaths
American people of Hungarian-Jewish descent
American people of Russian-Jewish descent
University of California, Berkeley alumni
Jewish American musicians
American folk singers
Columbia Records artists
Songwriters from San Francisco
Singers from San Francisco
American women singer-songwriters
20th-century American singers
Activists from the San Francisco Bay Area
Jewish folk singers
American Unitarian Universalists
American folk guitarists
American blues guitarists
American acoustic guitarists
20th-century American guitarists
Guitarists from San Francisco
20th-century American women singers
Jewish women musicians
20th-century American women guitarists
20th-century American Jews
Singer-songwriters from California